Church of the True God, Shaoxing is a Protestant church located on the East Street, in Shaoxing, Zhejiang, China.

History 
The American Baptist Churches USA came to Shaoxing in 1866. The church was first built in 1871 by American minister Qin Jing and was rebuilt in 1920.

The church was closed during the ten-year Cultural Revolution and became a seat of the Red Guards. In 1976, it was used as a theater for the Shaoxing Opera Troupe. The church was officially reopened to the public in 1982 after renovations. In August 2002, it was designated as a municipal cultural relic preservation organ by the Shaoxing government.

References

Further reading 
 

Churches in Shaoxing
Tourist attractions in Shaoxing
1920 establishments in China
Protestant churches in China
Churches completed in 1920